Jambagh flower market is a flower market located at Hyderabad, India. It is part of Moazzam Jahi Market.

The flower market was shifted to Gudimalkapur market in 2009.

References

Retail markets in Hyderabad, India
Retail markets in India
Flower markets